Solitude is an unincorporated community in Lynn Township, Posey County, in the U.S. state of Indiana.

History
A post office was established at Solitude in 1858, and remained in operation until 1917. The community was named for its quiet character.

Geography

Highways
 Indiana State Road 69

References

Unincorporated communities in Posey County, Indiana
Unincorporated communities in Indiana